William Albert Albrecht (September 12, 1888 – May 19, 1974) chairman of the Department of Soils at the University of Missouri, was the foremost authority on the relation of soil fertility to human health and earned four degrees from the University of Illinois at Urbana–Champaign. As emeritus professor of soils at the University of Missouri, he saw a direct link between soil quality, food quality and human health. He drew direct connections between poor quality forage crops, and ill health in livestock and from this developed a formula for ideal ratios of cations in the soil, the Base Cation Saturation Ratio. While he did not discover cation exchange in the soil as is sometimes supposed, he may have been the first to associate it with colloidal clay particles. He served as 1939 President of the Soil Science Society of America.

Twenty years before the phrase 'environmental concern' crept into the national consciousness, he was lecturing from coast to coast on the broad topic of agricultural ecology. (C. Edmund Marshall, In Memoriam, 'Plant and Soil' vol 48.)

Early life
William Albrecht was born of German ancestry on a farm on the prairie of north central Illinois in the Mid-West United States. After attending the local school he progressed via preparatory school to the University of Illinois where he obtained a B.A. degree in liberal arts. This led to a position teaching Latin and other subjects at Bluffton University, Ohio.

Albrecht later returned to Illinois to gain a B.S. degree in biology and agricultural science.  He then started graduate research in Botany whilst also teaching in the department of botany. This period was key to his lifelong devotion to scientific study of plant physiology and agriculture. It enabled him to take a microbiological view of plant structure whilst addressing the soil as a variable environment (either favourable or unsuitable).  He presented his doctoral research in 1919, and it was published in the journal Soil Science in 1920 titled 'Symbiotic nitrogen fixation as influenced by nitrogen in the soil' His paper concluded that the nitrogen level in soil had no significant effect on fixation by legumes.

Career
Albrecht was a devout agronomist, the foremost authority on the relation of soil fertility to human health and earned four degrees from the University of Illinois. He became emeritus professor of soils at the University of Missouri. Dr. Albrecht saw a direct link between soil quality and food quality, drawing direct connection between poor quality forage crops, and ill health in livestock.

From the late 1930s, as chairman of the Department of Soils at the University of Missouri, he began work at the Missouri Agricultural Experiment Station investigating cation ratios and the growth of legumes. He had been investigating cattle nutrition, having observed that certain pastures seemed conducive to good health, and at some point he came to the conclusion that the ideal balance of cations in the soil was "H, 10%; Ca, 60 to 75% optimal 69%; Mg, 10 to 20% optimal 12%; K, 2 to 5%; Na, 0.5 to 5.0%; and other cations, 5%".

While Albrecht was a highly respected soil scientist, he discounted soil pH, stating that "plants are not sensitive to, or limited by, a particular pH value of the soil." Instead, he believed that the benefits of liming soil stem from the additional calcium available to the plant, not the increase in pH. This belief has continued to be held by followers to this day, despite opinions to the contrary. Like much of the early research into BCSR where soil pH was not controlled, it is difficult to draw solid conclusions from Albrecht's research in support of BCSR.

Throughout his life, Albrecht looked to nature to learn what optimizes soil, and attributing many common livestock diseases directly to those animals being fed poor quality feeds. He observed that :

Albrecht was a prolific author of reports, books and articles that span several decades, starting with his reports on nitrogen fixation and soil inoculation in 1919. MVG

Soil depletion
Albrecht was outspoken on matters of declining soil fertility, having identified that it was due to a lack of organic material, major elements, and trace minerals, and was thus responsible for poor crops and in turn for pathological conditions in animals fed deficient foods from such soils.

He laid the blame as:

Death and commemoration
On his death he left his research papers to his friend Charles Walters who promoted the ideas by founding the magazine Acres USA, which continues to be at the centre of the ideal soil movement, and is the current owner of the research papers.

List of publications
Albrecht published widely from 1918 through 1970:

 Variable Levels of Biological Activity in Sanborn Field After Fifty Years of Treatment, Soil Science, 1938
 Animals Recognize Good Soil Treatment, Better Crops With Plant Food Magazine, 1940
 Organic Matter – The Life of the Soil, Farmer's Week, Ohio State University, 1940
 Good Horses Require Good Soils, Horse and Mule Association of America, 1940
 Calcium-Potassium-Phosphorus Relation as a Possible Factor in Ecological Array of Plants, Journal of the American Society of Agronomy, 1940
 Making Organic Matter Effective in Soil, The Ohio Vegetable and Potato Growers Association, 1940
 Calcium as a Factor in Seed Germination, Journal of the American Society of Agronomy, 1941
 The Soil as a Farm Commodity or a Factory, Journal of the American Society of Farm Managers and Rural Appraisers, 1941
 Soil Organic Matter and Ion Availability for Plants, Soil Science, 1941
 Biological Assays of Soil Fertility, Soil Science Society of America, 1941
 Potassium in the Soil Colloid Complex and Plant Nutrition, Soil Science, 1941
 Feed Efficiency in Terms of Biological Assays of Soil Treatments, Soil Science Society of America, 1942
 Health Depends on Soil, The Land, 1942
 Soil Management By Nature or By Man?, Western Soils Co., 1942
 Soil Fertility and the Human Species, American Chemical Society, Chemical and Engineering News, 1942
 We Are What We Eat - St. Louis Post-Dispatch, 1943
 Why Do Farmers Plow?, Better Crops With Plant Food Magazine, 1943
 Magnesium Depletion in Relation to Some Cropping Systems and Soil Treatments, Soil Science, 1943
 We Are What We Eat, St. Louis Post-Dispatch, 1943
 Make the Grass Greener on Your Side of the Fence, The Business of Farming, 1943
 Soil and Livestock, The Land, 1943
 Fertilize the Soil Then the Crop, University of Missouri, 1943
 Soil Fertility and National Nutrition, Journal of the American Society of Farm Managers and Rural Appraisers, 1944
 Better Pastures Depend on Soil Fertility, The Fertilizer Review, 1944
 Taking Our Soil for Granted, The Ranchman, 1944
 Soil Fertility, Food Source, The Technology Review, 1944
 Mobilizing the Fertilizer Resources of Our Nation's Soil, 28th Annual Convention of the National Crushed Stone Association, 1945
 How Long Do the Effects from Fertilizer Last?, Better Crops With Plant Food Magazine, 1945
 Food Quality from the Soil, Consumer's Research, Inc., 1945
 Vegetable Crops in Relation to Soil Fertility, Food Research, 1945
 Discrimination in Food Selection by Animals, The Scientific Monthly, 1945
 Vegetable Crops in Relation to Soil Fertility-V. Calcium contents of Green Leafy Vegetable, Food Research, 1945
 By Soil Treatments on Pastures, Guernsey Breeders' Journal, 1946
 Extra Soil Fertility Lengthens Grazing Season!, Guernsey Breeders' Journal, 1946
 Why Be a Friend of the Land?, Land Letter, 1946
 The Soil as the Basis of Wildlife, Management University of Missouri, 1946
 Soil and Livestock Work Together, 42nd Annual Meeting-American Meat Institute, 1947
 Soil Fertility - The Basis of Agricultural Production, 4th Annual Meeting of the Western Colorado Horticultural Society, 1947
 Soil Fertility and Animal Production, 58th Annual Meeting of the Indiana State Dairy Association, 1947
 Our Teeth and our Soils, Annals of Dentistry, 1947
 Hidden Hungers Point to Soil Fertility, Chilean Nitrate Educational Bureau, Inc., 1947
 Use Extra Soil Fertility to Provide Protein, Guernsey Breeders' Journal, 1947
 Better Soils Make Better Hogs, Hampshire Herdsman, 1947
 Limestone—The Foremost of Natural Fertilizer, Pit and Quarry, 1947
 Soil Fertility and Nutritive Value of Foods, Agricultural Leaders' Digest, 1948
 Some Rates of Fertility Decline, Better Crops With Plant Food Magazine, 1948
 There is No Substitute for Soil Fertility, Better Crops With Plant Food Magazine, 1948
 Quality of Crops also Depends on Soil Fertility, Chilean Nitrate Educational Bureau, Inc., 1948
 Potassium Helps Put More Nitrogen into Sweetclover, Journal of the American Society of Agronomy, 1948
 National Pattern of Tooth Troubles Points to Pattern of Soil Fertility, Journal of the Missouri State Dental Association, 1948
 Climate, Soil, and Health. I. Climatic Soil Pattern and Food Composition, Oral Surgery, Oral Medicine, and Oral Pathology, 1948
 Building Soils for Better Herds, Polled Hereford World, 1948
 Diversity of Amino Acids in Legumes According to the Soil Fertility, Science, 1948
 Carbohydrate-Protein Ratio of Peas in Relation to Fertilization with Potassium, Calcium, and Nitrogen, Soil Science of America Proceedings, 1948
 Is the Cure in the Soil?, The Furrow, 1948
 Soil and Protein, The Land, 1948
 Our Soils Our Food and Ourselves, The Mennonite Community, 1948
 Declining Soil Fertility - Its National and International Implications, 4th Annual Convention of National Agricultural Limestone Association, 1949
 Nutrition Via Soil Fertility According to the Climatic Pattern, British Commonwealth Scientific Official Conference, 1949
 Plant and Animal Nutrition in Relation to Soil and Climatic Factors, British Commonwealth Scientific Official Conference, 1949
 Nitrogen for Proteins and Protection Against Disease, Chilean Nitrate Educational Bureau, Inc., 1949
 Cows are Capable Soil Chemists, Guernsey Breeders' Journal, 1949
 Diseases as Deficiencies Via the Soil, Iowa State College Veterinarian, 1950
 Too Much Nitrogen or Not Enough Else?, National Live Stock Producer, 1950
 Soil Fertility: Its Climatic Pattern, The Journal of Osteopathy, 1950
 Weed Killers and Soil Fertility, The Rural New Yorker, 1950
 Quality of Food Crops According to Soil Fertility, The Technology Review, 1945
 Soil Fertility and Alfalfa Production, University of Missouri, 1950
 Animals Recognize Good Soil Treatment, Better Crops with Plant Food Magazine, 1951
 Reconstructing the Soils of the World to Meet Human Needs, Chemurgic Papers, 1951
 Soil Fertility in Relation to Animal and Human Health, Milk Industry Foundation Convention Proceedings, 1951
 War: Some Agricultural Implications, Organic Gardening, 1951
 Soil Fertility and our National Future, Texas Research Foundation, 1951
 Pattern of Caries in Relation to the Pattern of Soil Fertility in the United States, The Dental Journal of Australia, 1951
 Soil Fertility Pattern: Its Suggestion about Deficiencies and Disease, The Journal of Osteopathy, 1951
 Biosynthesis of Amino Acids According to Soil Fertility, University of Missouri, 1951
 Protein Deficiencies Via Soil Deficiencies, University of Missouri, 1951
 Managing Nitrogen to Increase Protein in Grains, Victory Farm Forum, 1951
 Soil Organic Matter Emphasizes Itself,  1952
 The Load on the Land, A Symposium, 1952
 More and Better Proteins Make Better Food and Feed, Better Crops with Plant Food Magazine, 1952
 Better Proteins Grow on Better Soils, Commercial Fertilizer, 1952
 Pastures and Soils, Corn Belt Livestock Feeder, Inc., 1952
 How Smart is a Cow?, Missouri Ruralist, 1952
 Soil Fertility and Amino Acid Synthesis by Plants, National Institute of Sciences of India, 1952
 The Value of Organic Matter, Rural New Yorker, 1952
 Proteins and Reproduction, The Land, 1952
 Soil Science Looks to the Cow, The Polled Hereford World Magazine, 1952
 Soil Fertility - A Weapon Against Weeds, University of Missouri, 1952
 Potassium Bearing Minerals as Soil Treatments, University of Missouri Bulletin, 1952
 Soil Acidity as Calcium (Fertility) Deficiency, University of Missouri Bulletin, 1952
 Our Soils and Our Health, Agricultural Leaders' Digest, 1953
 Red Clover Suggests Shortage of Potash, Better Crops with Plant Food Magazine, 1953
 Soil and Nutrition, California Fertilizer Association, 1953
 Soil Fertility, The Power Control of Agricultural Creation, Missouri Farmers Association, 1953
 Biosynthesis of Amino Acids According to Soil Fertility, Plant and Soil, 1953
 Proteins are Becoming Scarcer, The Polled Hereford World Magazine, 1953
 Human Ecology - The Soil Fertility Pattern Under it, University of Missouri, 1953
 WGN Farm Hour Interview, WGN Radio, 1953
 Nutrition and the Climatic Pattern of Soil Development, American Association for the Advancement of Science, 1954
 Let Rocks Their Silence Break, American Institute of Dental Medicine, 1954
 Droughts - The Soil has Reasons for Them, Journal of Applied Nutrition, 1954
 The Influence of Soil Mineral Elements on Animal Nutrition, Michigan State University, 1954
 Lime the Soil to Feed Crops, Missouri Farm News Service, 1954
 Soil Acidity (Low pH) spells Fertility Deficiencies, Pit and Quarry, 1954
 Lime the Soil to Correct Its Major Fertility Deficiencies, Rock Products, 1954
 Reconstructing Soils, The Challenger, 1954
 Fertilizer's Services in Plant Nutrition, University of Missouri, 1954
 Do We Overlook Protein Quality?, What's New in Crops & Soils, 1954
 Thin Roots are Searching for, Thick Roots are Finding, Soil Fertility,  1955
 Make Tax Allowance for Fertility Depletion, Agricultural Leaders' Digest, 1955
 Trace Elements and Agricultural Production, American Academy of Nutrition, 1955
 Should Farmers Receive Tax Allowance for Soil-Building?, Missouri Farm News Service, 1955
 It's the Soil That Feeds Us, Natural Food Associates, 1955
 Agricultural Limestone - For the Sake of More than Its Calcium, Pit and Quarry, 1955
 Capital No Substitute for Soil Fertility, Rock Products, 1955
 The Living Soil, The Golf Course Reporter, 1955
 Chemicals for the Improvement of Soils, University of Missouri, 1955
 Fertilizer for Higher Feed Value, University of Missouri, 1955
 Proteins, The Struggle for Them by all Forms of Life, Premised on the Fertility of the Soil, University of Missouri, 1955
 Physical, Chemical, and Biochemical Changes in the Soil Community, Wenner-Gren Foundation International Symposium, 1955
 Why Your Cattle Break Through the Fence, Western Livestock Journal, 1955
 Soils, Nutrition and Animal Health, Journal of the American Society of Farm Managers and Rural Appraisers, 1956
 Man's Role in Changing the Face of the Earth, University of Chicago Press, 1956
 Trace Elements and the Production of Proteins, Original Manuscript, 1957
 Soil Fertility and Biotic Geography, The Geographical Review, 1957
 Soil Fertility and the Quality of Seeds, University of Missouri Bulletin, 1957
 Balanced Soil Fertility, American Agricultural Reports, 1958
 Balanced Soil Fertility, Better Crops with Plant Food Magazine, 1958
 Balanced Soil Fertility - Less Plant Pests and Disease, Better Crops with Plant Food Magazine, 1958
 Balanced Soil Fertility - Less Plant Pests and Disease, Manuscript, 1958
 Soil Fertility and Plant Nutrition, Natural Food and Farming Digest, 1958
 Some Significant Truths About the Good Earth, Natural Food Associates, 1958
 Calcium - Boron Interaction, University of Missouri Bulletin, 1958
 Nitrogen, Proteins and People, Agricultural Ammonia News, 1959
 Nature Teaches Health via Nutrition, Guest Editorial, 1959
 Water: An American Problem, National Council for Social Studies, 1959
 Diagnoses or Post-Mortems?, Natural Food Associates, 1959
 Soil and Health, Natural Food Associates, 1959
 Human Health Closely Related to Soil Fertility, School and Community, 1959
 Growing Our Protein Supplements, University of Missouri, 1959
 The Biotic Pyramid, 1960
 Soil Fertility in Relation to Animal Nutrition, Manuscript, 1960
 Trace Elements, Allergies, and Soil Deficiencies, The Journal of Applied Nutrition, 1960
 Man and His Habitat - Wastebasket of the Earth, Bulletin of the Atomic Scientists, 1961
 Soils - Their Effects on the Nutritional Values of Foods, Consumer Bulletin, 1961
 Fluoridation of Public Drinking Water, Manuscript, 1961
 Introduction of "Soil, Food and Health", Manuscript, 1961
 Fertile Soils Lessen Insect Injury, 1962
 Organic Matter for Plant Nutrition, Clinical Psychology, 1962
 Rocks, Dust and Life, Manuscript, 1962
 Organic Matter Balances the Soil Fertility, Natural Food and Farming, 1962
 The Healthy Hunzas, The Journal of Applied Nutrition, 1962
 Soils Need "Living" Fertility!, Western Livestock Journal, 1962
 Soil and Survival of the Fit, Manuscript, 1963
 Only Balanced Diets for Plants, Via Soil, Can Grow Balanced Proteins, Mineralas, 1963
 A Policy for Preventing Agricultural Suicide, Natural Food and Farming, 1963
 Biosynthesis of Amino Acids According to Soil Fertility, Plant and Soil, 1963
 Lime the Soil to Correct Its Major Fertility Deficiencies, Rock Products, 1963
 Grow Self-Protection Via Soil as Nutrition, Clinical Psychology, 1964
 Magnesium - Its Relation to Calcium in Body Tissues, Let's Live, 1965
 Plant, Animal and Human Health Vary With Soil Fertility - Modern Nutrition, 1966
 Magnesium in the Soils of the United States, Let's Live, 1966
 The "Half-Lives" of Our Soils, Manuscript, 1966
 Plant, Animal and Human Health Vary With Soil Fertility, Modern Nutrition, 1966
 Magnesium Integrates With Calcium, Natural Food and Farming, 1967
 Problems of Quality in the Productivity of Agricultural Land, Journal of Applied Nutrition, 1968
 Soils and Chemistry, Manuscript, 1968
 Trace Elements and Soil Organic Matter, Manuscript, 1968
 Calcium Membranes in Plants, Animals and Man, The Journal of Applied Nutrition, 1968
 Concerning the Influence of Calcium on the Physiological Function of Magnesium, Manuscript, 1970

Posthumous publications
 Albrecht's Foundation Concepts (The Albrecht Papers, Vol I), [Paperback], William A. Albrecht (Author), Charles Walters (Editor)
 Soil Fertility & Animal Health (The Albrecht Papers, Vol II), [Paperback], William A. Albrecht (Author), Charles Walters (Editor)
 Albrecht on Calcium (The Albrecht Papers, Vol V), [Paperback], William A. Albrecht (Author), Charles Walters (Editor)
 Albrecht on Pastures (The Albrecht Papers, Vol VI), [Paperback], William A. Albrecht (Author), Charles Walters (Editor)
 Albrecht on Soil Balancing (The Albrecht Papers, Vol VII)'', [Paperback], William A. Albrecht (Author), Charles Walters (Editor)

See also
 Ion exchange

References

1888 births
1974 deaths
American agronomists
American soil scientists
University of Illinois College of Liberal Arts and Sciences alumni
University of Missouri faculty
Scientists from Illinois
Scientists from Missouri
20th-century American scientists
American people of German descent
Bluffton University
20th-century American male writers
University of Illinois College of Agriculture, Consumer, and Environmental Sciences alumni